Stan Waterman (born May 1966) is an American college basketball coach who is the current head coach of the Delaware State Hornets men's basketball team.

Early life and education
Waterman grew up in Wilmington, Delaware and attended Howard Career Center High School. Playing point guard, he was named Second Team All-State as a senior and earned an invitation to the Delaware High School All-Star Basketball Game. Waterman led the team to the state championship game in 1981 and the state semifinals in 1983. He received a scholarship to Delaware. Waterman sat out the 1985-86 season to focus on his studies. He made his first career start in February 1988 and finished with six points, seven assists, and five rebounds. Waterman earned a degree in sociology in 1988.

Coaching career
Following the close of his college career, Waterman pursued a coaching career. Waterman served as an assistant coach at Wilmington during the 1989-90 season. In June 1990, he became an assistant coach at the Sanford School, while maintaining a job with Child Protective Services in Wilmington. Waterman was named head coach at the Sanford School in April 1991, after the resignation of Thom Shumosic. Waterman was named dean of students in 1993. He coached a girls team known as the Warriors in 2006, which won the Urban Youth Inc Fall League Championship and featured his daughter Paris as its star point guard. In 2016, Waterman earned the Tubby Raymond Award as Coach of the Year from the Delaware Sportswriters & Broadcasters Association. He was named an assistant coach for the 2019 USA Nike Hoop Summit Team. During his 30-year tenure, he led the Warriors to 571 victories and eight state titles, including in 2019 and 2021. His 2019-20 team reached the state semifinals before it was cancelled due to the COVID-19 pandemic. 

On June 3, 2021, Waterman was hired as head coach of Delaware State. He replaces Eric Skeeters, who was fired after finishing 3-16 in the 2020-21 season. Villanova head coach Jay Wright stated, "His passion and dedication to the state are unmatched. Delaware State University has made a great choice in Stan Waterman.”

Head coaching record

References

1966 births
Living people
American men's basketball coaches
Basketball coaches from Delaware
Basketball players from Wilmington, Delaware
Delaware Fightin' Blue Hens men's basketball coaches
College men's basketball head coaches in the United States
Delaware State Hornets men's basketball coaches
High school basketball coaches in Delaware
Wilmington Wildcats men's basketball coaches